Jacek Hankiewicz (born 22 December 1965) is a Polish badminton player. He competed in the men's singles tournament at the 1992 Summer Olympics.

References

1965 births
Living people
Polish male badminton players
Olympic badminton players of Poland
Badminton players at the 1992 Summer Olympics
People from Krosno